Mynydd Isa Spartans Football Club is a Welsh football team based in Mynydd Isa, near Mold, Flintshire, Wales.  The team currently play in the North East Wales Football League Premier Division, which is at the fourth tier of the Welsh football league system.

History
Mynydd Isa had previously been represented by a team, Mynydd Isa FC who rose to the second tier of football in Wales, the Cymru Alliance, before dissolving in 2009.

The current team was formed in 2015 as Ewloe Spartans but a move to the Argoed Sports and Social Club at Mynydd Isa in 2016 meant the club changed to its current name of Mynydd Isa Spartans.

In their first season as Mynydd Isa, the Spartans gained promotion to the Welsh National League (Wrexham Area) by finishing as runners-up in the 2016-17 North East Wales League.

The club joined the newly formed North East Wales Football League in 2020 as a Premier Division club.

Honours
North East Wales League Runners-up: 2016–17

External links
Club official Twitter
Club official Facebook

References

Football clubs in Wales
North East Wales Football League clubs
Sport in Flintshire
Association football clubs established in 2015
2015 establishments in Wales
Clwyd East Football League clubs